The 1948 Drexel Dragons football team represented the Drexel Institute of Technology (renamed Drexel University in 1970) as an independent during the 1948 college football season.  Ralph Chase was the team's head coach for the first five games of the season, when Maury McMains took over head coaching duties in order to allow Chase to focus on coaching the basketball team.

Schedule

Roster

References

Drexel
Drexel Dragons football seasons
College football winless seasons
Drexel Dragons football